A'eron island is a tiny island (approx  800 ft x 1600 ft) located near the mouth of the Umpqua River on the Pacific coast of Oregon in the United States. At very low tides it can be reached via the Oregon Dunes National Recreation Area over a narrow naturally occurring sand causeway or by boat at higher tide levels.

Flora and fauna
Island vegetation includes of a variety of grasses, shrubbery, and pine trees. A small colony of burrowing rodents can be found near the center of the island along with evidence of larger carnivorous mammals that may or may not reside there. Clubs of fur seals frequent the western shore of the island and can often be seen basking on the beach. The island's long (3000 ft) southern sand bar is an abundant resource for shellfish. Evidence of human hunting suggests a notable amount of migratory waterfowl during certain seasons. There are a few sites suitable for camping, but no significant structures are present on the island.

References

External links
 
 

Landforms of Douglas County, Oregon